The discography of BYO Records, an independent record label based in Los Angeles, consists of 118 releases: 85 studio albums, one live album, 13 compilation albums, 2 EPs, 15 singles, one video album, and one box set.

BYO (Better Youth Organization) Records was started in 1982 by brothers Shawn and Mark Stern of the band Youth Brigade. The label's first release was the compilation album Someone Got Their Head Kicked In!, showcasing a number of Los Angeles punk rock acts. This was followed by Youth Brigade's debut album Sound & Fury, released in limited numbers and re-recorded the following year with a different track list. Over the next few years the label released albums by notable acts including 7 Seconds, SNFU, and Jr. Gone Wild.

The label was inactive following the decline of hardcore punk in 1986, releasing only two albums between 1987 and 1991. It was revived in 1992 in conjunction with the Sterns' new act Royal Crown Revue and the revival of Youth Brigade. During the punk rock revival of the 1990s BYO released albums by Jughead's Revenge, The Bouncing Souls, Automatic 7, Hepcat, 22 Jacks, Terrorgruppe, Pezz, Jon Cougar Concentration Camp, and others. The BYO Split Series was launched in 1999, a series of split albums featuring two bands per release; it lasted until 2004 and comprised five albums.

Since 2000 BYO has released albums by Pistol Grip, Manic Hispanic, Filthy Thieving Bastards, The Unseen, Sixer, One Man Army, Consumed, Throw Rag, The Business, The Briefs, Clit 45, A Global Threat, Wednesday Night Heroes, and others. In 2009 the label celebrated its (approximate) 25th anniversary with the release of Let Them Know: The Story of Youth Brigade and BYO Records, a box set chronicling the label's history in a coffee table book, a documentary film on DVD, and a compilation album on both CD and double LP of bands covering songs from the BYO catalog.

Releases

References 
 
 

 Discography
Discographies of American record labels